The 2015–16 Oregon State Beavers women's basketball team represented Oregon State University during the 2015–16 NCAA Division I women's basketball season. The Beavers, led by sixth year head coach Scott Rueck, played their games at the Gill Coliseum and are members of the Pac-12 Conference. They finished the season 32–5, 16–2 in Pac-12 play to share the Pac-12 regular season title with Arizona State. They won the Pac-12 women's tournament for the first time in school history and received an automatic bid of the NCAA women's tournament where they defeated Troy and St. Bonaventure in the first and second rounds, DePaul in the Sweet Sixteen and Baylor in the Elite Eight to reach the Final Four for the first time school history. They lost to eventual winner Connecticut in the Final Four. With 32 wins in the regular season, they ended the season with the most wins in program history.

Roster

Rankings

Schedule

|-
!colspan=9 style="background:#c34500; color:black;"| Exhibition

|-
!colspan=9 style="background:#c34500; color:black;"| Non-conference regular season

|-
!colspan=9 style="background:#c34500; color:black;"| Pac-12 regular season

|-
!colspan=9 style="background:#c34500;"|Pac-12 Women's Tournament

|-
!colspan=9 style="background:#c34500;"|NCAA Women's Tournament

See also
2015–16 Oregon State Beavers men's basketball team

References

Oregon State Beavers women's basketball seasons
Oregon State
2015 in sports in Oregon
Oregon State
NCAA Division I women's basketball tournament Final Four seasons
2016 in sports in Oregon